Nesactium (Istrian dialect: Vizače) was an ancient fortified town and hill fort of the Histri tribe. Its ruins are located in southern Istria, Croatia, between the villages of Muntić and Valtura.

History

In pre-Roman times, Nesactium, ruled by its legendary king Epulon, was the capital of the tribal population of the peninsula called Histri, who were also connected to the prehistoric Castellieri culture. Some theories state a later Celtic influence, but who they were and where they came from has never been discovered for certain. It is believed that their main economic activities were trade and piracy all over the ancient Mediterranean Sea.

In 177 BC, the town was conquered by the Romans and destroyed. Rebuilt upon the original Histrian pattern, it was a Roman town until 46–45 BC, when the Ancient Greek colony Polai was elevated to Pietas Iulia, today Pula. The town was located on the ancient road Via Flavia, which connected Trieste to Dalmatia. The area was abandoned by the Romans in the 6th century, following the Avaro-Slav invasions. Its Histro-Roman walls still remain.

References

External links
 Nesactium on Istrianet.org
 History of Nesactium
 Neolithic Nesactium Hillfort

Iron Age sites in Europe
Megalithic monuments in Europe
Forts in Croatia
Illyrian Croatia
Archaeology of Illyria
Archaeological sites in Croatia
Former populated places in the Balkans
Cities in ancient Illyria
Oppida
Roman fortifications in Croatia